Gibberella tricincta is a fungal plant pathogen. Gibberella tricincta produces the antifungal alkaloid Fungerin.

See also
 Gibberellic acid

References

External links
 Index Fungorum
 USDA ARS Fungal Database

tricincta
Fungal plant pathogens and diseases
Fungi described in 1838